Local elections were held in the province of Lanao del Sur on May 9, 2016, as part of the 2016 general election. Voters will select candidates for all local positions: a town mayor, vice mayor and town councilors, as well as members of the Sangguniang Panlalawigan, the vice-governor, governor and representatives for the two districts of Lanao del Sur.

Provincial elections
The candidates for governor and vice governor with the highest number of votes wins the seat; they are voted separately, therefore, they may be of different parties when elected. Incumbent Governor Mamintal Alonto Adiong Jr. and Vice Governor Arsad Maruhombsar are barred from seeking reelection since they are in their third term.

Background
The result of the election will determine if the Alonto-Adiong can still preserve their grip on the province. Incumbent Governor Adiong Jr. is barred to seek another term due to term limit, his brother First District Congressman Ansaruddin Adiong was expected by some of their allies to be his candidate. Meanwhile, Liberal Party (the governor's party) considered Governor Adiong's uncle-in-law Deputy Speaker of the House of Representatives of the Philippines Pangalian Balindong to be the party's gubernatorial bet.

But at the end, Governor Adiong Jr. will  be fielding his mother, former First Lady Bae Soraya Alonto Adiong for the gubernatorial position against Deputy Speaker Pangalian Balindong and United Nationalist Alliance bet Marawi City Mayor Fahad "Pre" Salic and three others. While Governor Mamintal Adiong Jr. decided to run as his mother running mate against Marantao Mayor Mohammadali Abinal of United Nationalist Alliance and two others.

Candidates

Incumbents are expressed in italics.

Governor
The gubernatorial race will be between Governor Adiong's mother former First Lady Bae Soraya Adiong of the Liberal Party, his long time ally and uncle-in-law Deputy Speaker of the House of Representatives of the Philippines Pangalian Balindong, and the tough Marawi City Mayor Fahad "Pre" Salic of United Nationalist Alliance, and three others. But it is expected to be a three-way race between former First Lady Adiong, Deputy Speaker Balindong and City Mayor Salic.

Vice-governor
Incumbent Vice-governor Arsad Maruhombsar is barred to seek another term and decided to retire from politics. Governor Mamintal Alonto Adiong Jr. decided to be his mother's running mate of the Liberal Party to preserve their grip on the province. Meanwhile, Marantao Mayor Mohammadali Abinal is nominated as the United Nationalist Alliance Vice-Gubernatorial bet and also chosen by Deputy Speaker Balindong as his vice-governor candidate.

Congressional Elections

1st District of Lanao del Sur
Former Congressman Hussein Pacasum Pangandaman and his father former secretary of Agrarian Reform Nasser Pangandaman were rumored to be one of the candidates for the district representative. But instead, the latter decided to run for the mayoralty position of the Municipality of Masiu. And at the end, Incumbent Ansaruddin Alonto Adiong will face again former Congresswoman Faysah Dumarpa of the United Nationalist Alliance, and two others for his second term.

2nd District of Lanao del Sur
The battle for the congressional race in the second district is shaping up to be between the powerful Alonto and the old yet influential Dimaporo clan. Incumbent Deputy Speaker of the House of Representatives of the Philippines Pangalian Balindong is barred for seeking another term, he will instead run for Governor. His son, incumbent ARMM Regional Legislative Assembly Assemblyman Yasser Alonto Balindong is his party's nominee against the late Batasang Pambansa Speaker Pro-Tempore Macacuna Dimaporo's son-in-law Tubaran Mayor Jun Papandayan and two others.

Provincial Board Elections

First District
City: Marawi City
Municipality: Buadiposo-Buntong, Bubong, Bumbaran, Ditsaan-Ramain, Kapai, Lumba-Bayabao, Maguing, Marantao, Masiu, Mulondo, Piagapo, Poona Bayabao, Saguiaran, Tagoloan II, Tamparan, Taraka, Wao
Population (2010): 547,633

|-bgcolor=black
|colspan=5|

Second District
Municipality: Bacolod-Kalawi, Balabagan, Balindong, Bayang, Binidayan, Butig, Calanogas, Ganassi, Kapatagan, Lumbaca-Unayan, Lumbatan, Lumbayanague, Madalum, Madamba, Malabang, Marogong, Pagayawan, Picong, Pualas, Sultan Dumalondong, Tubaran, Tugaya
Population (2010): 385,627

|-bgcolor=black
|colspan=5|

Mayoral Election

Islamic City of Marawi
Incumbent City Mayor Fahad "Pre" Salic is barred to seek another term and decided to run for governor. The battle for the mayoralty race in the province's capital is to be between Mayor Salic's elder brother former city mayor Solitario Ali, ARMM Regional Legislative Assembly Assemblyman Majul Gandamra and Ismael Tomawis.

First District

Buadiposo-Buntong

Bubong
Incumbent Mayor Alfais Munder will seek another term against Wahab Macapundag of KBL and Danny Langgoyo.

Bumbaran

Incumbent Mayor Jamal "James" Manabilang will seek another term unopposed.

Ditsaan-Ramain

Kapai

Lumba-Bayabao
Incumbent Mayor and Lumba-Bayabao kingpin Gambai Dagalangit will seek another term again and will face his relative Amialongan Dagalangit, Mangatha Dianaton, Abdul Rashid Macala of Liberal Party and Fatah Rasul.

Maguing

Marantao
Incumbent Mayor Racma Abinal will seek another term again and will face Samson Adiong, Jasmin Adtha-Magangcong, Kiram Tahir,
Mohammad Tanggote.

Masiu

Mulondo

Piagapo
Incumbent Mayor Ali Sumandar will seek another term and will face Asnawie Bato, Sittie Mandalog, Adil Sultan.

Poona Bayabao
Incumbent Mayor Lampa Pandi is barred to seek another term and will run as town vice mayor. The battle for the mayoralty position will be between Tohamy Domado, Ibrahim Yusoph, Alibasha Lucman, Cacayadun Manta, Sadat Pandi and Sana Sangkupan.

Saguiaran

Tagoloan II

Tamparan

Taraka

Wao
The battle for the mayoralty position will be between Liberal Party's Bobby Balicao, Mary Ruth Catalan and Lominog Hadji Nasser.

Second District

Bacolod-Kalawi
Incumbent Mayor Abdul Mohaimen Dipatuan will seek another term against Tamim Amanoddin, Sartata Dipatuan and Bogdad Balindong.

Balabagan
Incumbent Mayor Edna Benito will seek another term against her nemesis and uncle mayor-elect but disqualified former Mayor Amer Sampiano, another uncle incumbent Vice-Mayor Quirino Sampiano, Apolo Morro and Chicote Norma.

Balindong
Incumbent Mayor Raysalam Bagul-Mangondato is eligible for another term. She filed her candidacy for re-election but withdraw and instead supported her brother, former mayor Benjamin Bagul against Linindingan Ramos, Mahmod Abdullah and Socor Tomara.

Bayang
Incumbent Mayor Maya Ampatua will seek for another term against Aslani Balt, Cairon Macadaub, Camil Sangcoopan and Bryan Sarip.

Binidayan
Incumbent Mayor Abdullah Datumulok is eligible for another term. He will be facing the tandem of his two predecessors and brother former Mayor Aman Misbac Datumolok and another former Mayor Punudaranao Datumulok, and three others.

Butig

Calanogas
Incumbent Mayor and Calanogas kingpin Macapado Benito Sr. is unopposed for his position.

Ganassi
The battle for the Mayoralty position will be a rematch between incumbent mayor Al-Rashid Macapodi and Fahad Diangka.

Kapatagan

Lumbaca-Unayan

Lumbatan

Lumbayanague
The battle for the Mayoralty position will be between UNA's nominee Salamona Asum, Liberal Party's Ansary Gunting, Simpan Gunting and Alexander Salo.

Madalum

Madamba

Malabang
Incumbent Mayor Omensalam Balindong will be facing her in-law Amer Balindong, and two others for her re-election.

Marogong
Incumbent Mayor Haroun Maruhom will be challenged by incumbent Vice-Mayor Alioden Didatoon, and three others for his re-election.

Pagayawan

Picong

Pualas

Sultan Dumalondong

Tubaran

Incumbent Mayor Jun Papandayan is allowed to seek another term but instead decided to run for the district representative. He decided to field his son Khaled Yassin Papandayan against his nemesis's son Abdelyusoph Fahad, his brother-in-law Rafael Yassin Dimaporo, Fais Amil and Likapao Andag.

Tugaya

References

2016 Philippine local elections
Elections in Lanao del Sur